Kirstine is a given name. Notable people with the name include:

Kirstine Fiil (1918–1983), Danish resistance member
Kirstine Frederiksen (1845–1903), Danish pedagogue, writer and women's activist
Kirstine Meyer (1861–1941), Danish physicist
Kirstine Roepstorff (born 1972), Danish visual artist 
Kirstine Smith (1878–1939), Danish statistician
Kirstine Stewart (born c. 1968) Canadian media executive and author
Kirstine Stubbe Teglbjærg,  Danish singer

See also
Kirstin, given name